Abby May Erceg (born 20 November 1989) is a New Zealand professional footballer who plays as a defender for Racing Louisville FC in the National Women's Soccer League. She has previously played for Chicago Red Stars and North Carolina Courage in the NWSL, Jena in the German Bundesliga, FC Saitama in the Japanese Nadashiko League and Adelaide United in the Australian W-League. She formerly played for the New Zealand national team, where she became the first player (male or female) from New Zealand to play 100 international matches.

Early life
Erceg attended Mount Roskill Grammar School.

Club career
Erceg signed with German side Jena in 2013. She was loaned to the Chicago Red Stars, an NWSL club, and played there for two months during the Bundesliga's 2014 summer break. After she returned and played the first half of the 2014–15 Bundesliga season, she and the Jena club ended her contract during the winter break.

Erceg then signed with the Chicago Red Stars in May 2014.

In November 2015, the Red Stars traded her to the Western New York Flash.

In 2016, she captained the Western New York Flash to a NWSL League Championship.

Erceg became part of the North Carolina Courage in 2017 after the Western New York Flash were sold to the owners of North Carolina FC. She would remain captain as the Courage won the 2017 NWSL Shield and appeared in the 2017 NWSL Final where they lost 1–0 to the Portland Thorns. Erceg was named to the NWSL Second XI for the 2017 season.

Erceg was named the NWSL Team of the Month for May, June, July & August in the 2018 season. She helped the Courage to win their second straight NWSL shield. North Carolina broke the record for fewest goals conceded during a season, and only suffered 1 loss. The North Carolina Courage won the 2018 NWSL Championship after beating the Portland Thorns 3–0. They didn't concede a goal in either of their play-off games. Erceg was named to the 2018 NWSL Best XI, and was named 2018 NWSL Defender of the Year.

Erceg was again named in the NWSL Second XI for 2019 as the Courage won the NWSL Shield and Championship again.

In January 2023, the Courage traded Erceg, along with Carson Pickett, to Racing Louisville FC in exchange for Emily Fox.

International career

Erceg made her full Football Ferns début in a 0–3 loss to China on 14 November 2006, and represented New Zealand at the 2007 FIFA Women's World Cup finals in China, where they lost to Brazil 0–5, Denmark (0–2) and China (0–2).

Erceg was also included in the New Zealand squad for the 2008 Summer Olympics where they drew with Japan (2–2) before losing to Norway (0–1) and USA (0–4). In  the following tournament, Erceg helped New Zealand reach the quarterfinals, the Ferns' first ever knockout game in a FIFA tournament. There they lost 2–0 to the United States.

She was included in the U-20 squad for the 2008 Women's U-20 World Cup finals in Chile.
Erceg earned her 50th cap for New Zealand aged just 21 when starting New Zealand's 2011 Cyprus Cup opening match against the Netherlands on 2 March 2011 and becoming the third most capped female player in New Zealand Football history with 62 caps to her name. Erceg was also a part of the team that qualified for the Women's Football World Cup that took place in Germany, in 2011 where they finished 12th overall.

Erceg's experience led her to be named captain of the Football Ferns in 2014. In the first game of the 2014 OFC Women's Nations Cup, she became the first player from New Zealand to reach 100 international caps.

She featured in all New Zealand's three matches at the 2015 FIFA Women's World Cup in Canada. Erceg was named for the 2016 Olympics squad, which will be her sixth international tournament representing New Zealand.

In February 2017, Erceg announced her retirement from the international game on social media, writing "Due to the unfortunate and unfavourable circumstances within the organisation that is NZF, it is with regret and great sadness that today is the day that I announce my retirement from the international game. Without being able to justify my involvement any longer I will be stepping back in the hopes to create change for the current and future generations of NZ footballers."

In February 2018, Erceg came out of retirement to play for New Zealand in their two friendlies against Scotland in Spain. She then retired again for the second time in May 2018 before New Zealand's friendly against Japan.

In January 2019, Erceg came back out of international retirement ahead of the 2019 Cup of Nations and the 2019 FIFA Women's World Cup.

In April 2019, Erceg was named to the final 23-player squad for the 2019 FIFA Women's World Cup.

In June 2021, Erceg was named to the roster for the 2020 Summer Olympics.

In January 2023, Erceg again retired from the national team.

International goals

Personal life
Erceg is of Croatian-Māori descent, and affiliates to the Ngāpuhi iwi.

Honours
Western New York Flash
NWSL Champions: 2016
North Carolina Courage
NWSL Champions: 2018, 2019
NWSL Shield: 2017, 2018, 2019

 NWSL Challenge Cup: 2022
Individual
NWSL Defender of the Year: 2018
NWSL Best XI: 2018
NWSL Second XI: 2017, 2019, 2020
IFFHS OFC Woman Team of the Decade 2011–2020

References

External links

 
 
 
 
 
 
 

1989 births
Living people
Adelaide United FC (A-League Women) players
Chicago Red Stars players
Expatriate women's footballers in Germany
Expatriate women's soccer players in the United States
FIFA Century Club
FF USV Jena players
Footballers at the 2008 Summer Olympics
Footballers at the 2012 Summer Olympics
Footballers at the 2016 Summer Olympics
Ngāpuhi people
National Women's Soccer League players
New Zealand expatriate sportspeople in the United States
New Zealand expatriate sportspeople in Germany
New Zealand people of Croatian descent
New Zealand women's association footballers
New Zealand women's international footballers
North Carolina Courage players
Olympic association footballers of New Zealand
Racing Louisville FC players
Sportspeople from Whangārei
Western New York Flash players
Women's association football defenders
2007 FIFA Women's World Cup players
2011 FIFA Women's World Cup players
2015 FIFA Women's World Cup players
2019 FIFA Women's World Cup players
Footballers at the 2020 Summer Olympics
Expatriate women's soccer players in Australia
New Zealand expatriate sportspeople in Australia
New Zealand expatriate women's association footballers